Dr. Toni Ho is a superhero appearing in American comic books published by Marvel Comics.

Publication history

Toni Ho first appeared in New Avengers vol. 4 #1 (2015) and was created by writer Al Ewing and artist Gerardo Sandoval.

Fictional character biography
Toni Ho is the daughter of Ho Yinsen, an engineer with three doctorate degrees.

Toni became a member of the Avengers Idea Mechanics after being bought out by Roberto da Costa. She serves as part of a support team for the New Avengers. Toni also studied Aikku Jokinen, the sentient Pod suit's wearer. Toni took an interest in Aikku because of the Pod suit and also because she sympathizes with Aikku's personal reasons for not wanting to take Pod off. Toni fell in love with Aikku who also reciprocated these feelings. The two were attacked by the Maker, but Toni defended Aikku and Pod. When Pod ejected Aikku, Toni helped her love interest with the new under-suit Enigma.

Toni is a member of the U.S. Avengers as the Iron Patriot. In the group's first mission, the team encountered the Secret Empire in a floating volcanic island base. The group is later approached by Danielle Cage (as a future equivalent of Captain America) when the Golden Skull arrived in the present timeline to steal all the world's wealth. In Miami, Florida, the team crashes a charity gala, only to discover that the wealthy CEOs were kidnapped and replaced by robots. During the battle, the team managed to defeat the Golden Skull (equipped with an armored suit) and Captain America, then went back into the future timeline with the Golden Skull as a prisoner.

During the "Opening Salvo" part of the Secret Empire storyline, Aikku got concerned over Toni since she had been spending too much time working on her upgraded Iron Patriot armor. During the event, the team arrived in Washington D.C. to confront Hydra. During this, Robert Maverick attacked the group due to nanites that were injected by Hydra's double-agent Kyle. In an attempt to save the group, Toni used a teleportation device to transport Enigma and Squirrel Girl away, with her two teammates ending up in Paris. Toni and the Red Hulk were then captured and imprisoned, where the two saw Roberto almost dead in one of the cells. While adjusting to prison life, Toni managed to save Roberto just in time when Hydra soldiers arrived at their cell. At the prison, Toni helped Roberto defeat the guards and free the Red Hulk from the controlling nanites, enabling the three to take control of the prison. After Toni and Squirrel Girl helped the Champions of Europe in defeating Hydra soldiers in Paris, she contacted Enigma and made plans to have the two return to the United States. She also told Enigma that she would quit the Iron Patriot mantle so that their relationship can continue. During all this, Toni let go of her anger towards her father's sacrifice. Afterwards, Toni deactivated the Red Hulk's nanites, enabling Maverick to return to normal. She is later approached by A.I.M. agents wanting her to be the organization's new leader after Roberto quit.

While traveling through space, Smasher and the U.S.Avengers were attacked by space pirates known as Warpjackers. After a brief fight, the pirates told them that Glenbrook was actually the planet Kral X and that its ruler, Ritchie Redwood, was ruthless. Arriving in Kral X, the heroes managed to help Cannonball and the planet's rebels in overthrowing Ritchie. After restoring order to the planet, the heroes headed home.

After Roberto left the American Intelligence Mechanics, Toni succeeded and allowed the rogue A.I.M. cells to regain the terrorist acronym, as Toni had her organization rebranded as R.E.S.C.U.E.

Additionally, Toni uses her computer expertise to assist Ironheart in rescuing Tony Stark, and appears as a member of the Daughters of Liberty while using the alias of Hekate-4 to help Steve Rogers.

Other versions
 An alternate version of the character, Antonia Yinsen, appears in the 2015 Secret Wars crossover event as someone in power in her father's place in Yinsen City.
 An alternate version of the character is shown having had a brief relationship with Rikki Barnes who had been reincarnated into her reality until they were both murdered by the Maker.

In other media

Television
 Iron Patriot appears in the Avengers Assemble episode "Into the Future", voiced by Laura Bailey. This version is a resistance fighter from a future ruled by Kang the Conqueror.

References

External links
 Toni Ho at Marvel Wiki

Asian-American superheroes
Avengers (comics) characters
Comics characters introduced in 2015
Fictional engineers
Fictional lesbians
Fictional LGBT characters in television
Marvel Comics female superheroes
Marvel Comics LGBT superheroes